The Beauty of Men is a 1996 novel by Andrew Holleran, about Lark, a 47-year-old single gay man, who has moved to Florida to help care for his mother, who became paralyzed after a fall.

Story
The novel is set in the mid-1980s when AIDS was ravaging a generation of gay men back home in New York City.  In Florida, Lark lives alone, has few friends, terrified of venturing out in the daylight.  Had he stayed in New York he would be just as alone for a different reason.  Now, instead of going to clubs and bath houses, he goes to the boat ramp and the one local gay bar two towns over in Gainesville.  He has become obsessed with a local man named Becker with whom he spent one long night and has followed periodically since.

Award nominations
It was nominated for the 1997 ALA Gay Lesbian Bisexual Books award and the Lambda Book Award for Gay Fiction.

References

External links
 Publishers' Weekly review
 Review in International Gay and Lesbian Review

1996 American novels
Novels by Andrew Holleran
Novels about HIV/AIDS
Novels set in Florida
Fiction set in the 1980s
1990s LGBT novels
Novels with gay themes